Llandegley, is a village near Llandrindod Wells, in the community of Penybont, in Powys, mid Wales, United Kingdom. It is the location of Llandegley International Airport.

This area is represented in the Welsh Parliament by James Evans (Conservative) and in the United Kingdom Parliament by Fay Jones (Conservative).

References 

Villages in Powys